A Mathematical Theory of Natural and Artificial Selection is the title of a series of scientific papers by the British population geneticist J.B.S. Haldane, published between 1924 and 1934.  Haldane outlines the first mathematical models for many cases of evolution due to selection, an important concept in the modern synthesis of Darwin's theory with Mendelian genetics.

Overview 

The papers were published in ten parts over ten years in three different journals.

Mathematical Theory of Natural and Artificial Selection, A
Biology papers
Works by J. B. S. Haldane
Modern synthesis (20th century)